Isaak James (born on Cape Cod, Massachusetts) is an American film director, actor, singer and musician. He is the founder of Last Ditch Pictures. James is based in New York.

Education 
James graduated New York University's Tisch School of the Arts

Film 
In 2006, with his sister Eva James, James wrote, directed and starred in Special Needs which was acquired by Lloyd Kaufman at Troma Entertainment in 2007.

Since 2008 James has written and directed three other feature films; Hungry Years (2008)  Turbine (2010) and By Way of Home (2011). "By Way of Home" was produced for $1000 and was referred to by Eugene Hernandez at Film Lincoln Center as part of the "Homegrown" film movement. James' most recent film "Awesome_FCK" (2015) screened as part of the Toronto International Film Festival's Short Cuts, Spring Awakening lineup  and was awarded a jury prize at the Provincetown International Film Festival.

James' films are available on Netflix, Amazon & iTunes

Television

James has appeared in TV shows including I Wanna Be a Soap Star 2.

External links 

Isaak James bio at Isaak James.com
Last Ditch Pictures at Internet Movie Database
Last Ditch Pictures Official Website
Special Needs at Internet Movie Database
Special Needs at Official Movie Website
Hungry Years at Internet Movie Database

References

Living people
Male actors from New York (state)
Tisch School of the Arts alumni
People from Barnstable County, Massachusetts
Male actors from Massachusetts
Singers from Massachusetts
Film directors from Massachusetts
Year of birth missing (living people)